"If You Want to Find Love" is a song co-written and recorded by American country music artist Kenny Rogers.  It was released in November 1991 as the first single from the album Back Home Again.  The song reached #11 on the Billboard Hot Country Singles & Tracks chart.  Rogers wrote the song with Skip Ewing and Max D. Barnes.

The song features backing vocals from Linda Davis and the Branson Brothers.

Chart performance

References

1991 songs
Kenny Rogers songs
Songs written by Max D. Barnes
Songs written by Skip Ewing
Songs written by Kenny Rogers
Song recordings produced by Jim Ed Norman
Reprise Records singles
1991 singles